The 1993 CCHA Men's Ice Hockey Tournament was the 22nd CCHA Men's Ice Hockey Tournament. It was played between March 12 and March 21, 1993. First-round games were played at campus sites, while second-round and 'final four' games were played at Joe Louis Arena in Detroit, Michigan. By winning the tournament, Lake Superior State received the Central Collegiate Hockey Association's automatic bid to the 1993 NCAA Division I Men's Ice Hockey Tournament.

Format
The tournament featured four rounds of play. The teams that finished in the top six in conference standings were allowed to choose their opponents in descending order for the first round. Alaska–Fairbanks was an affiliate member and allowed to compete in the conference tournament as the lowest seed. The first seed chose to play the eleventh seed, the second seed chose to play the tenth seed, third seed chose to play the ninth seed, the fourth seed chose to play the eighth seed, the fifth seed chose to play the seventh seed and the sixth seed played the twelfth seed in best-of-three series, with the winners advancing to the second round. The highest two remaining seeds received byes into the semifinal round while the remaining four teams competing in single-game second-round series. The highest and lowest non-advancing teams were matched against one another for one game while the remaining two teams competing in the other game. In the semifinals the higher automatic qualifier played the lower seed advancing from the second round while and second-highest and second-lowest seeds played each in a single game to determine which teams advanced to the finals. The tournament champion received an automatic bid to the 1993 NCAA Division I Men's Ice Hockey Tournament.

Conference standings
Note: GP = Games played; W = Wins; L = Losses; T = Ties; PTS = Points; GF = Goals For; GA = Goals Against

Bracket

Note: * denotes overtime period(s)

First round

(1) Miami vs. (11) Ohio State

(2) Michigan vs. (10) Notre Dame

(3) Lake Superior State vs. (9) Illinois–Chicago

(4) Michigan State vs. (8) Kent State

(5) Western Michigan vs. (7) Bowling Green

(6) Ferris State vs. (12) Alaska–Fairbanks

Second round

(3) Lake Superior State vs. (7) Bowling Green

(4) Michigan State vs. (6) Ferris State

Semifinals

(1) Miami vs. (6) Ferris State

(2) Michigan vs. (3) Lake Superior State

Championship

(1) Miami vs. (3) Lake Superior State

Tournament awards

All-Tournament Team
F Brian Rolston (Lake Superior State)
F Wayne Strachan (Lake Superior State)
F Rob Valicevic (Lake Superior State)
D Bob Marshall (Miami)
D Michael Smith (Lake Superior State)
G Blaine Lacher* (Lake Superior State)
* Most Valuable Player(s)

References

External links
CCHA Champions
1992–93 CCHA Standings
1992–93 NCAA Standings

CCHA Men's Ice Hockey Tournament
Ccha tournament